The United Kingdom, Ireland and the Isle of Man are interconnected by five subsea and overland gas pipelines. These provide facilities for the transfer of natural gas from sources in Scotland and England to consumers in Northern Ireland, the Republic of Ireland, and the Isle of Man.

Background 
The Republic of Ireland had a supply of natural gas from the Kinsale Head offshore field which was in production from 1978 to 2020. As production declined so further sources of natural gas were identified and assessed. One approach was to abstract gas from the British National Grid’s National Transmission System (NTS) in Scotland. The NTS is fed from gas fields on the UK Continental Shelf; from Europe (Belgium, the Netherlands and Norway); and as Liquid Natural Gas (LNG) obtained internationally.

The interconnectors

Interconnector No.1 
The earliest interconnector (designated Interconnector No.1) was commissioned in 1991. The NTS take-off point is from the No. 11 and No. 12 Feeders at the Beattock Compressor Station north of Moffat, Scotland. From the take-off point gas is routed to a compressor station where the gas pressure is raised to 85 barg. A 36-inch diameter buried overland pipeline transports the gas to Brighouse Bay on the coast. The Brighouse compressor station raises the gas pressure to 140 barg. Gas is routed through a 24-inch diameter, 162 km long subsea pipeline to Gormanston, Co. Meath, Ireland where controls feed gas into the Irish gas distribution system.

SNIP 

The second interconnector is the Scotland to Northern Ireland Pipeline (SNIP). Gas is taken from a Tee in the Beattock to Brighouse Bay pipeline at Twynholm. The 24-inch diameter pipeline is routed overland to Stranraer and then subsea to Ballylumford power station Northern Ireland. SNIP is 135 km long and was commissioned in 1996. From Ballylumford a pipeline continues as the 24-inch diameter 35 km long Belfast Gas Transmission Pipeline (BGTP) to Belfast via Carrickfergus. The 18-inch diameter 112 km long North-West Pipeline (NWP) connects to the BGTP at Carrickfergus and extends to Coolkeeragh power station. The NWP has take-offs to pressure reduction stations at Ballymena, Coleraine, Maydown and Derry.

Interconnector No.2 
The third  interconnector (designated Interconnector No.2) were commissioned in 2003. The new system comprised a second compressor station at Beattock, a second overland pipeline, and an extension to the compressor at Brighouse. The latter feeds gas into a 30-inch diameter 192 km long subsea pipeline to Gormanston, where it supplies gas for the Irish gas system.

IOMS 
At its nearest point Interconnector No.2 is 11 km from the Isle of Man. This gave an opportunity to provide a gas supply to the Isle of Man. A 10-inch Tee on the Interconnector and a 10-inch subsea spur (Isle of Man Spur, IOMS) pipeline which supplies gas to the Glen Mooar Above Ground Installation (AGI) on Isle of Man. Gas is transferred to the Pulrose power station near Douglas. Several districts are provided with a supply of natural gas.

SNP 
The fifth interconnector is a 156 km long overland cross border pipeline from the Republic of Ireland to Northern Ireland. This is called the South North Pipeline (SNP) and was commissioned in 2006. At Gormanston there is a connection between IC2 and the southern end of the SNP. The northern end of SNP is connected to the NWP 12 km west of Carrickfergus. The SNP has take-offs to pressure reduction stations at Newry, Banbridge, Derryhale, Lisburn and Belfast.

The key parameters of the interconnecting pipelines are summarised in the table.

Gas export and import 
Gas exported from the United Kingdom to the Republic of Ireland was as shown on the graph (in GWh):

Gas exported from the United Kingdom to the Isle of Man was as shown on the graph (in GWh):

See also 

 National Transmission System
 Isle of Man gas industry
 Oil and gas industry in the United Kingdom
 Energy in Ireland
 Ervia

References 

Natural gas pipelines in the United Kingdom
Submarine pipelines
Natural gas infrastructure in the United Kingdom
Natural gas in Northern Ireland
Energy in the Isle of Man